Narayan Malhar Joshi (5 June 1879 – 30 May 1955) was an Indian trade union leader and follower of Gopal Krishna Gokhale.
Joshi became involved in labour issues and started the All India Trade Union Congress in 1920 along with Lala Lajpat Rai. He was the general secretary of AITUC from 1925 to 1929 and from 1940 to 1948. 
In 1931, he left AITUC and started the All India Trade Union Federation.

In 1911, Joshi established an organization called the Social Service League. The League conducted training programmes for volunteers, whose services were later utilized for relief work among people suffering from famines, epidemics, floods and other disasters, and also for welfare programmes among the poor and the destitute. He was president of Bombay Textile Labor Union. Among other titles, he is considered one of the pioneers in Modern Indian Social Work.
On 20th September 1922, N M Joshi established an organization called the Sahakari Manoranjan Mandal. The 'sahakari' conducted training programmes for theatre artist, which later on successfully run verious sangeet natak plays written and directed by mill workers.

Early life
Narayan Malhar Joshi was born into Deshastha Brahmin family on 5 June 1879 at Girgaon, Kolaba district, Maharashtra.

See also
Trade unions in India
All India Trade Union Congress

References

Bibliography

Trade unionists in British India
1879 births
1955 deaths
People from Raigad district
Members of the Central Legislative Assembly of India
Indian National Congress politicians